The Alien Adventures of Finn Caspian is a serialized science fiction podcast about an 8-year-old and his friends exploring space and solving mysteries together. It is written and produced by Jonathan Messinger.

Premise 
The podcast's story follows the adventures of an 8-year-old named Finn Caspian and his three friends Abigail, Elias, and Vale as they explore different planets in the famous Interplanetary Exploratory Space Station called Marlowe 280. Along the way, Caspian and his friends, who are all part of the Explorer Troop 301, encounter mysteries and help aliens.

Production 
The podcast is recorded by Jonathan Messinger and his son Griffin in the basement of their home in Portage Park, Chicago. Jonathan Messinger founded a kids podcast company called Typedrawer Media that started out with Finn Caspian. The podcast has also been a part of Gen-Z Media and was later acquired by MiMO Studios.

Main cast and characters 

 Finn Caspian
 Abigail
 Elias
 Vale
 BeeBop

Episodes

Reception 
Frannie Ucciferri wrote in The Washington Post that the show "is perfect for long car rides." Jen McGuire made a similar comment in Romper saying that the podcast is "perfect for driving around town with the family." Janelle Randazza of Reviewed said the podcast "is perfectly gripping and a great choice". The show won the 2017 Academy of Podcasters award for best kids and family podcast.

Adaptations 
In 2020, the podcast was acquired by MiMO studio with the intention to adapt the podcast into animated TV-length movies.

Messinger has also released four books based on the podcast.

 Messinger, Jonathan; Bitskoff, Aleksei (2020). The Alien Adventures of Finn Caspian #1: The Fuzzy Apocalypse. HarperCollins. ISBN 9780062932150.
 Messinger, Jonathan; Bitskoff, Aleksei (2020). The Alien Adventures of Finn Caspian #2: The Accidental Volcano. HarperCollins. ISBN 9780062932181.
 Messinger, Jonathan; Bitskoff, Aleksei (2020). The Alien Adventures of Finn Caspian #3: The Uncommon Cold. HarperCollins. ISBN 9780062932204.
 Messinger, Jonathan; Bitskoff, Aleksei (2020). The Alien Adventures of Finn Caspian #4: Journey to the Center of That Thing. HarperCollins. ISBN 9780062932235.

References

External links 

 
 
 

2016 podcast debuts
Audio podcasts
Science fiction podcasts
Children's podcasts
Scripted podcasts